The 2015–16 Florida State Seminoles women's basketball team, variously Florida State or FSU, represented Florida State University during the 2015–16 NCAA Division I women's basketball season. Florida State competed in Division I of the National Collegiate Athletic Association (NCAA). The Seminoles were led by nineteenth year head coach Sue Semrau and played their home games at the Donald L. Tucker Center on the university's Tallahassee, Florida campus. They were members of the Atlantic Coast Conference.

The Seminoles achieved their fourth straight twenty-win season and reached the Sweet Sixteen of the NCAA tournament in consecutive years for the first time in school history.

Previous season

Florida State finished the 2014–15 season with a 32–5 record, 14–2 in ACC play, to finish in second place. They appeared in the finals of the ACC Tournament and reached the elite eight of the NCAA Tournament.

Roster

Depth chart

Rankings

Schedule
Florida State was picked to finish second in the ACC while Adut Bulgak and Leticia Romero were named to the preseason All-ACC team. Adut Bulgak was named a preseason All-American.

|-
!colspan=12 style="background:#; color:white;"| Exhibition

|-
!colspan=12 style="background:#; color:white;"| Non-conference regular season

|-
!colspan=12 style="background:#; color:white;"| ACC regular season

|-
!colspan=12 style="background:#; color:white;"| ACC Women's Tournament

|-
!colspan=12 style="background:#; color:white;"| NCAA Women's Tournament

Awards
ACC Sixth Player of the Year
Shakayla Thomas

Watchlists
Naismith Trophy
Adut Bulgak
Leticia Romero
Wade Trophy
Adut Bulgak

Finalists
Senior CLASS Award
Adut Bulgak

Honors
ACC Player of the Week
Adut Bulgak
Shakayla Thomas
National Player of the Week
Shakayla Thomas

All-ACC

First Team
Shakayla Thomas
Second Team
Adut Bulgak
Defensive Team
Brittany Brown

All-Americans
Second Team
Adut Bulgak
Honorable Mention
Leticia Romero
Shakayla Thomas

WNBA draft
One player was selected in the 2016 WNBA draft.

Media
All Seminoles games will air on the Seminole IMG Sports Network.

References

External links
 Official Team Website
 Media Almanac

Florida State Seminoles women's basketball
Florida State
Florida State
Florida State Seminoles women's basketball seasons